This article is the Electoral history of Kim Campbell, the nineteenth Prime Minister of Canada.

A Progressive Conservative, Campbell was the first woman to serve as prime minister.  She served one short term in 1993.  She succeeded Brian Mulroney as prime minister and then led the Progressive Conservative Party of Canada in the general election of 1993.  The Progressive Conservatives were almost wiped out in the election, going from a majority government of 154 seats at dissolution, to two seats and loss of party status in the House of Commons. It was the worst defeat of a federal government in Canadian history.

Campbell lost her own seat and announced her resignation on election night.  Jean Chrétien, leader of the Liberal Party of Canada, succeeded her as prime minister. Jean Charest became leader of the Progressive Conservative party.

Campbell stood for election to the House of Commons twice.  She was elected in the general election of 1988, but defeated in the 1993 election.

Prior to entering federal politics, Campbell had been involved in provincial and municipal politics in her home province of British Columbia.

Summary 

Campbell ranks twenty-first out of twenty-three prime ministers for time in office, serving one term of 132 days.  Only Charles Tupper and John Turner had shorter terms in office.

She was the second prime minister from British Columbia, the other being John Turner.

Mulroney announced his retirement early in 1993, triggering a leadership convention in June, 1993.  Campbell won on the second ballot, defeating Jean Charest.

When she succeeded Mulroney as prime minister on June 25, 1993, there were only two months left in the five-year term of the 34th Canadian Parliament, which had been elected in 1988.  Campbell was required to call a general election quickly.  The election was a disaster for the Progressive Conservative party:  they went from a solid majority in the Commons to only two seats.  Under the rules of the House of Commons, the Progressive Conservatives did not have enough seats for official party status.  It was the worst loss for a federal government in Canadian history.

Campbell was defeated in her own seat and announced her resignation.  Jean Charest became the party leader.

Campbell stood for election to the Commons twice:  she won her seat in 1988, and was defeated in 1993.  She served in the Commons for four years, eleven months, and three days.

Prior to entering federal politics, Campbell had been on the Vancouver School Board, and then a member of the Legislative Assembly of British Columbia, elected as a member of the Social Credit Party of British Columbia.  In 1986, she entered the leadership race for the Social Credit party, but came in last on the first ballot and was eliminated.

Federal general election: 1993 

Campbell led the Progressive Conservative Party in one general election (1993).  She was decisively defeated by Jean Chrétien and the Liberals, reduced to two seats in the House of Commons, the worst defeat of a federal government in Canadian history. 

1 Leader of the Opposition when election was called;  Prime Minister after election.
2 Not a Member of Parliament when election was called;  Leader of the Opposition after the election.
3 Prime Minister when election was called;  not a Member of Parliament after the election. 
4 Table does not include parties which received votes but did not elect any members.

Federal constituency elections:  1988 and 1993 

Campbell stood for election to the House of Commons two times.  She was elected the first time, in 1988, but defeated the second time, in 1993.

1988 Federal Election: Vancouver Centre 

 Elected. 
1  Rounding error.

1993 Federal Election: Vancouver Centre 

 Elected. 
X Incumbent. 
1 Less than 0.5%;  rounded to zero.
2 Rounding error.

British Columbia Constituency Elections:  1983, 1986 

Campbell stood for election in two provincial elections, 1983 and 1986, as a candidate for the British Columbia Social Credit Party.  She was defeated in 1983, but elected in 1986.

British Columbia constituency election: 1983 

Note:  the riding returned two members.

 Elected. 
X Incumbent. 
1 Rounding error.

British Columbia constituency election: 1986 

Note:  the riding returned two members.

 Elected. 
X Incumbent. 
1 Rounding error.

Vancouver Municipal Politics 

Campbell began her political career by standing for the Vancouver School Board (1981-1984).  She served two terms, including terms as Chair (1983) and Vice-Chair (1984).

Leadership Conventions

Progressive Conservative Party of Canada: 1993 

Mulroney announced his retirement in February, 1993.  Campbell won the party leadership at a convention in June, 1993, winning on the second ballot.

Social Credit Party of British Columbia: 1986 

Following the resignation of Bill Bennett as leader of the British Columbia Social Credit Party, there was a leadership convention in July, 1986.  Campbell was a candidate in the crowded field, but was eliminated on the first ballot.

1 Rounding error.

See also 

 Electoral history of Brian Mulroney - Campbell's predecessor as leader of the Progressive Conservative Party and as Prime Minister.
 Electoral history of Jean Chrétien - Campbell's successor as Prime Minister.

References

External links 

Library of Parliament:  History of Federal Ridings since 1867
CPAC – 1993 Progressive Conservative Leadership Convention

Campbell, Kim